World Day Against Cyber Censorship is an online event held each year on March 12 to draw attention to the ways that governments around the world are deterring and censoring free speech online. The day was first observed on 12 March 2008 at the request of Reporters Without Borders and Amnesty International. A letter written by Jean-François Julliard, Secretary-General of Reporters Without Borders, and Larry Cox, Executive Director of Amnesty International, was sent to the Chief Executive Officers of Google, Yahoo!, Inc., and Microsoft Corporation to request observation of the day.
The annual event is symbolized by a logo created by Reporters Without Borders consisting of a computer mouse breaking free from a chain.

Netizen Prize

On World Day Against Cyber Censorship, Reporters Without Borders awards an annual Netizen Prize that recognizes an Internet user, blogger, cyber-dissident, or group who has made a notable contribution to the defense of online freedom of expression. Starting in 2010 the prize has been awarded to:

 2010: Iranian women's rights activists of the Change for Equality website, www.we-change.org.
 2011: the founders of a Tunisian blogging group named Nawaat.org.
 2012: Syrian citizen journalists and activists of the Media center of the Local Coordination Committees.
 2013: Vietnamese blogger Huynh Ngoc Chenh.
 2014: Saudi Arabian blogger Raif Badawi.

Enemies of the Internet list

In conjunction with World Day Against Cyber Censorship, Reporters Without Borders updates its Enemies of the Internet and Countries Under Surveillance lists.

 Reddit (deletes comments, suspends, bans using 'hate speech' as cover)
 The Guardian (deletes comments, suspends, bans using 'hate speech' as cover)
 Wikipedia (opposing views are classified as vandalism, automatically reverts changes, censors, bans IP addresses)

See also

Internet censorship
Internet censorship and surveillance by country
Reporters Without Borders

References

External links
"Privacy is for the powerless." Edward Snowden, at Amnesty International, March 2016

International observances
Internet censorship
Freedom of the press
March observances
2008 introductions